Steve Collins (born 13 March 1964) is a Canadian former ski jumper who was successful in the 1980s.

Career
Steve began his World Cup jumping career on 27 December 1979 with a 10th place finish at Cortina d'Ampezzo Italy on the Large Hill, followed 3 days later with a 66th place finish on the K-115 hill at Schattenbergschanze in Oberstdorf, Germany.  The following year, on 28 February 1980, he won the FIS Junior World Ski Championships at Örnsköldsvik in Sweden. In 1979 Collins won the national Tom Longboat Award that recognizes Aboriginal athletes for their outstanding contributions to sport in Canada.  He once held the record for the longest jump on a 90-meter hill with 128.5 meters at Big Thunder in Thunder Bay on 15 December 1980.  Along with team-mate Horst Bulau, Canada gained more than respectable results in the sport that had been dominated by Europeans.  He left the World Cup circuit in 1988, but returned to his home hill in Thunder Bay for both hills in 1990 and his final World Cup appearance on 12 February 1991.

World Cup

Standings

Medals

Olympics

References

External links

1964 births
Canadian male ski jumpers
First Nations sportspeople
Living people
Ojibwe people
Olympic ski jumpers of Canada
Ski jumpers at the 1980 Winter Olympics
Ski jumpers at the 1984 Winter Olympics
Ski jumpers at the 1988 Winter Olympics
Skiing people from Ontario
Sportspeople from Thunder Bay